Major General Pehr David Albert Janse (31 January 1893 – 2 October 1961) was a Swedish Army officer. Janse's senior commands include regimental commander of the Gotland Infantry Regiment, Inspector of the Swedish Armoured Troops and acting commanding officer of the IV Military District.

Early life
Janse was born on 31 January 1893 in Lidingö, Sweden, the son of lieutenant colonel Albert Fredrik Daniel Janse and his wife Carolina Elisabeth (née Swartz).

Career
Janse was commissioned as underlöjtnant in the Scanian Dragoon Regiment (Skånska dragonregementet, K 6) in 1913 and lieutenant in the Swedish Army in 1918, and in 1926, after completing the Royal Swedish Army Staff College and completing the post of aspirant, became captain of the General Staff. He transferred to the Life Regiment Dragoons (K 2) in 1921 and after that regiment's disbandment in 1928 to the Life Regiment of Horse (K 1), where in 1930 he was appointed ryttmästare. In 1935 he re-entered the General Staff as major and Chief of Staff of the Cavalry Inspectorate (Kavalleriinspektionen).

Two years later, he was appointed lieutenant lieutenant at the General Staff Corps and in 1938 he was lieutenant colonel in the Södermanland Regiment (I 10), where from 1939 he served as commander of the armored battalion. In 1941, Janse became regimental commander of Gotland Infantry Regiment (I 18), and took up the newly created position as Inspector of the Swedish Armoured Troops in 1942 and was appointed acting military commander of the IV Military District in 1945. Janse left the post in 1953 and retired from the military. The same year he took up a position as inspector at the Svenska BP AB.

Janse was from 1943 editor of the military-technical journal Pansar ("Armour") (from 1945 Pansar-Teknik-Underhåll, "Armour-Technology-Maintenance"). From 1947 he was chairman of the Föreningen för befrämjande av skolungdomens vapenövningar ("Association for the Promoting of the School Youth's Weapons Exercises").

Personal life
In 1920, Janse married Ella Hedvig Marianne Holtermann (1895–1949), the daughter of Cabinet Chamberlain Oscar Holtermann and Countess Maud von Rosen. They had three children; (1920–2013), Maud (1923–2008) and Pehr (1931–1996).

In 1950, he married Countess Ewa Creutz (1913–1966), the daughter of Friherre Carl-Gustaf Creutz and Gertrud Mathilda Schröder.

Death
Janse died on 2 October 1961 and was buried on 18 October 1961 at Lidingö Cemetery.

Dates of rank
1913 – Underlöjtnant
1918 – Lieutenant
1926 – Captain
1930 – Ryttmästare
1935 – Major
1937 – Lieutenant colonel
1941 – Colonel
1948 – Major general

Awards and decorations
  Commander of the Order of the Sword
  Knight of the Order of Vasa
  Knight of the Order of the Dannebrog
  Knight First Class of the Order of the White Rose of Finland

Honors
Member of the Royal Swedish Academy of War Sciences (1943)

References

1893 births
1961 deaths
Swedish Army major generals
People from Lidingö Municipality
Members of the Royal Swedish Academy of War Sciences
Commanders of the Order of the Sword
Knights of the Order of Vasa